The Bramau is an eastern tributary of the Stör  in the German state of Schleswig-Holstein.

It begins in Bad Bramstedt at the confluence of the Osterau and the Hudau, known here as the Schmalfelder Au.

See also 
List of rivers of Schleswig-Holstein

Rivers of Schleswig-Holstein
Rivers of Germany